Anoxynatronum sibiricum  is a Gram-positive, saccharolytic, anaerobic, alkaliphilic bacterium from the genus of Anoxynatronum which has been isolated from the Baikal lake.

References

External links
Type strain of Anoxynatronum sibiricum at BacDive -  the Bacterial Diversity Metadatabase	

Clostridiaceae
Bacteria described in 2003
Alkaliphiles